NGC 2452 is a planetary nebula located in the southern constellation of  Puppis. NGC 2452 was discovered by Sir John Herschel in 1847.

NGC 2452 is located about 15,000 light-years (4.7 kiloparsecs) away from the Earth, and is about 40 to 50 thousand years old. In the sky, it appears close to the open cluster NGC 2453, and was previously thought to be a possible member of that cluster. However, it is merely a coincidence, and they are unrelated to each other; NGC 2452 is a foreground object relative to NGC 2453.

References

External links 
 

2452
Puppis
Planetary nebulae
493-11
07453-2712
Astronomical objects discovered in 1847